The Matanuska Colony Community Center, also Palmer Historic District, is a cluster of buildings near the center of Palmer, Alaska that were the centerpiece of the Depression-era Matanuska Valley Colony.  This federal rural resettlement program was intended to give needy families resources and land to improve their condition.  The colony's buildings were erected beginning in 1935, and those that survive represent a well-preserved example of government community planning.  It is centered on a city block bounded by East Dahlia Avenue, South Valley Way, South Denali Street, and East Elmwood Avenue, and extends to the north and south.  The buildings on this block are organized around a grassy quadrangle, laid out in 1935.  Prominent buildings include the Palmer Depot and three churches, located in the block just southeast of the quadrangle, one of which, the United Protestant Church, is a distinctive log structure.  The colony's Central School,  now added to several times, houses the offices of the Matanuska-Susitna Borough.

The area was listed on the National Register of Historic Places in 1991.

Demographics
The Matanuska Valley Colony Community Center was returned on the 1940 U.S. Census as the Alaska Railroad Colony Community Center (unincorporated). It had a population of 94. It has since been annexed into the city of Palmer.

See also
National Register of Historic Places listings in Matanuska-Susitna Borough, Alaska

References

Buildings and structures completed in 1940
Buildings and structures in Matanuska-Susitna Borough, Alaska
Historic districts on the National Register of Historic Places in Alaska
Buildings and structures on the National Register of Historic Places in Matanuska-Susitna Borough, Alaska